Lama is an upazila of Bandarban District in the Division of Chittagong, Bangladesh.

Geography
It has a total area of 671.84 km2.

Demographics

According to the 2011 Bangladesh census, Lama Upazila had 22,447 households and a population of 108,995, 17.4% of whom lived in urban areas. 13.4% of the population was under the age of 5. The literacy rate (age 7 and over) was 34.0%, compared to the national average of 51.8%.

Administration
Lama Upazila is divided into Lama Municipality and seven union parishads: Aziznagar, Faitang, Fasyakhali, Gajalia, Lama, Rupshipara, and Sarai. The union parishads are subdivided into 18 mauzas and 343 villages.

Lama Municipality is subdivided into 9 wards and 34 mahallas.

See also
Upazilas of Bangladesh
Districts of Bangladesh
Divisions of Bangladesh

References

Upazilas of Bandarban District